Runkuraqay or Runku Raqay (Quechua runku basket, raqay shed / derelict house / ruin)  is an archaeological site on a mountain of the same name in Peru located in the Cusco Region, Urubamba Province, Machupicchu District. It is situated southeast of the archaeological site Machu Picchu and south of the Vilcanota river. The ruins lie on the southern slope of the mountain Runkuraqay near the Runkuraqay pass, northeast of the archaeological site Sayacmarca and southeast of the site Qunchamarka.

Hiram Bingham III visited the site in April 1915.  Paul Fejos visited in 1940.

Gallery

See also 
 Inti Punku
 Patallaqta
 Phuyupatamarka
 Warmi Wañusqa
 Willkaraqay

References and notes 

Archaeological sites in Peru
Mountains of Peru
Archaeological sites in Cusco Region
Inca
Mountains of Cusco Region
Landforms of Cusco Region
Mountain passes of Peru